This is a chronological listing of significant events surrounding Latter Day Saints seeking or winning political office.  It refers primarily to members of the Church of Jesus Christ of Latter-day Saints (LDS Church), but also some members of other Latter Day Saint movement religions, such as Community of Christ, formerly the Reorganized Church of Jesus Christ of Latter Day Saints (RLDS).  In addition to listing events chronologically, political firsts are noted. This list is very incomplete.

1838
John Corrill elected to the Missouri House of Representatives.
This was the first Latter Day Saint elected to a state office in any state.
1841
William B. Smith elected to the Illinois House of Representatives.
This was the first Latter Day Saint elected to a state office in Illinois.
This was the first time a member of the Smith Family was elected to office.
1842
Joseph Smith elected Mayor of Nauvoo.
1844
Joseph Smith declares himself a candidate for President of the United States. He is assassinated during his campaign.
This was the first Latter Day Saint to run for president.
This was the first Latter Day Saint assassinated in office (as Mayor of Nauvoo).
1850
Brigham Young is appointed Governor of Utah Territory.
This is the first Latter Day Saint to hold a U.S. governorship.
1853
Jefferson Hunt is elected to the California State Assembly.
This is the first Latter Day Saint elected to state office in California.
James J. Strang is elected to the Michigan Legislature.
This is the first Latter Day Saint elected to state office in Michigan.
1855
James J. Strang is reelected to the Michigan Legislature.
1858
Brigham Young removed from office as Governor of Utah. 
1896
Utah gains statehood.
Martha Hughes Cannon first woman elected to any state senate in U.S. history (Utah).
Heber Manning Wells elected Utah Governor.
This is the first Latter Day Saint to be Utah governor since Brigham Young.
This is the first Latter Day Saint to be elected governor of any state. 
Frank J. Cannon elected U.S. Senator from Utah
First Latter-day Saint elected to the Senate. (Cannon later left the LDS Church and became a bitter anti-Mormon.)
1902
Reed Smoot elected to the U.S. Senate in Utah.
First LDS Church General Authority elected to the Senate. 
1911
Israel A. Smith elected to the Iowa State Legislature.
First direct descendant of Latter Day Saint movement founder Joseph Smith to be elected to political office.
1922
George Sutherland appointed to the U.S. Supreme Court. 
1928
J. Reuben Clark appointed U.S. Undersecretary of State.
1930
J. Reuben Clark appointed U.S. Ambassador to Mexico. 
1940
Berkeley Bunker appointed U.S. Senator from Nevada.
First Latter Day Saint to hold national office from Nevada.
First Latter Day Saint U.S. Senator from outside Utah.
1944
Berkeley Bunker elected to U.S. House of Representatives from Nevada.
1953
Ezra Taft Benson appointed U.S. Secretary of Agriculture.
Ivy Baker Priest appointed U.S. Treasurer.
1961
Stewart Udall appointed U.S. Secretary of the Interior.
1962
George W. Romney elected Governor of Michigan.
1968
George W. Romney declares candidacy for President of the United States (as Republican).
First Latter Day Saint to run for a major party's presidential nomination.
1969
David Matthew Kennedy appointed U.S. Secretary of Treasury.
George W. Romney appointed U.S. Secretary of Housing and Urban Development.
1976
Mo Udall declares candidacy for President of the United States (as Democrat).
1980
Paula Hawkins elected to U.S. Senate from Florida.
1981
Terrel Bell appointed U.S. Secretary of Education.
1982
Bay Buchanan baptized into LDS Church as sitting U.S. Treasurer.
Harry Reid wins election as a representative from Nevada.
1985
Jake Garn becomes first sitting U.S. Senator to fly in space.
1986
Harry Reid wins election as a Senator from Nevada.
1988
Evan Mecham impeached and removed from office as Governor of Arizona
1999
Three members of the Udall family serve in Congress simultaneously.  Two are Latter-day Saint. 
2000
Orrin Hatch declares candidacy for President of the United States (as Republican).
2002
Mitt Romney elected Governor of Massachusetts.
2004
Harry Reid becomes the Democratic Leader of the United States Senate, and the Senate Minority leader
2005
Michael O. Leavitt appointed U.S. Secretary of Health and Human Services.
2007
Harry Reid becomes Senate Majority Leader
Mitt Romney announces his candidacy for the U.S. presidency.
2011
Mitt Romney announces his candidacy for the U.S. presidency.
First Latter Day Saint to receive a major party's presidential nomination.
Jon Huntsman, Jr. announces his candidacy for the U.S. presidency.
2016
Evan McMullin announces his candidacy for U.S. presidency.

See also
 List of Mormon members of the United States Congress

References

Political History
Mormonism and politics